The 1989 Florida Gators football team represented the University of Florida during the 1989 NCAA Division I-A football season. The season was Galen Hall's sixth and final season as the head coach of the Florida Gators football team; Hall was replaced as the Gators head coach after five games by his defensive coordinator, Gary Darnell.  Hall and Darnell's 1989 Florida Gators posted an overall record of 7–5 and a Southeastern Conference (SEC) record of 4–3, tying for fourth place in the ten-team SEC.

Schedule

Personnel

Season summary

Ole Miss

Louisiana Tech

at Memphis State

Mississippi State

at Tampa, Florida

at LSU

Vanderbilt

New Mexico

at Auburn

vs. Georgia

at Jacksonville, Florida

Kentucky

Florida State

Freedom Bowl (vs. Washington)

at Anaheim, California

References

Florida
Florida Gators football seasons
Florida Gators football